Rajbanshi (also called Tajpuria) is a Bengali-Assamese language spoken in Nepal. It is related to, but distinct from Rangpuri/Kamta in Bangladesh and India, which is also known by the alternative name "Rajbanshi", with which it forms the KRNB cluster.

Phonology 

Consonants 

 can often be heard as post-alveolar , when following back vowels.
 can also have an allophone of [].
 can be realized as voiceless or voiced  in word-initial positions.
 can be heard as alveolar  before an alveolar consonant, and as a retroflex  when preceding a retroflex consonant.
A word-final  may tend to be voiceless .

Vowels 

In addition to these vowels, Rangpuri has the following diphthongs: .
  may also be heard as two sounds  in free variation.

Notes

References 

 
 

Eastern Indo-Aryan languages
Languages of Nepal
Languages of Koshi Province